The 1971 Pacific typhoon season has no official bounds; it ran year-round in 1971, but most tropical cyclones tend to form in the northwestern Pacific Ocean between June and December. These dates conventionally delimit the period of each year when most tropical cyclones form in the northwestern Pacific Ocean.

The scope of this article is limited to the Pacific Ocean, north of the equator and west of the international date line. Storms that form east of the date line and north of the equator are called hurricanes; see 1971 Pacific hurricane season. Tropical Storms formed in the entire west pacific basin were assigned a name by the Joint Typhoon Warning Center. Tropical depressions in this basin have the "W" suffix added to their number. Tropical depressions that enter or form in the Philippine area of responsibility are assigned a name by the Philippine Atmospheric, Geophysical and Astronomical Services Administration or PAGASA. This can often result in the same storm having two names.

Seasonal summary 

According to the United States Joint Typhoon Warning Center, the 1971 season was the most active season since 1967, with a total of 35 tropical storms being monitored by them during the year. In addition to the 35 tropical storms, the Japan Meteorological Agency considered Tropical Depression 25W to be an additional tropical storm, which was only classified as a tropical depression by the JTWC.

Systems

Severe Tropical Storm Sarah 

Over the next day the system gradually developed further as it moved north-westwards, before it was classified as a tropical storm and named Sarah by the JTWC, after a US Navy plane had found an organised system. The system subsequently recurved north-eastwards, before it was classified as a Severe Tropical Storm by the JMA during January 10. During that day, the JTWC reported that the system had peaked, with 1-minute sustained wind-speeds of 95 km/h (60 mph). Over the next day, the system quickly weakened and became an extratropical cyclone during January 11. Sarah's extratropical remnants were subsequently tracked as they moved north-eastwards, until it made landfall on Canada and broke up over the mountains of British Columbia during January 17.

Tropical Storm Thelma (Bebeng) 

On March 16, a tropical depression formed to the south of Guam. It immediately entered the Philippine Area of Responsibility, earning the local name Bebeng. It executed a small loop to the east of Mindanao before it traveled to the northwest. It exited the Area of Responsibility as a tropical storm before transitioning to an extratropical storm, southwest of Minami-Tori-shima. The extratropical storm weakened and dissipated on March 21, to the south-southeast of Japan.

Typhoon Vera (Karing)

Typhoon Wanda (Diding) 

On April 23 Tropical Storm Wanda began its life to the east of the Philippines. It tracked over the archipelago, and emerged into the South China Sea on the 25th. It turned to the northwest, and became a typhoon on May 1 just off the coast of South Vietnam. The westerlies brought Wanda to the north and northeast, where it weakened until dissipating on the 4th near Hainan Island.

The storm caused 56 deaths (with 14 missing) and $700,000 in damage (1971 USD) from the heavy flooding across the Philippines. While Wanda brushed the coast of Vietnam, the United States Army grounded most aircraft in northern areas and skirmishes related to the Vietnam War temporarily decreased until the storm passed by. In Quảng Ngãi Province, 23 people were killed.

Typhoon Amy 

According to the JTWC best track, Amy was first noted as a tropical depression early on April 29. Amy reached tropical storm status shortly afterwards, and became a typhoon by early on May 1. The cyclone then rapidly intensified into a Category 5 super typhoon with 1-minute sustained winds of 280 km/h (175 mph) on May 2, with the JMA estimating a minimum central pressure of 890 mb (hPa; 26.28 inHg), although the JTWC estimated a slightly higher pressure of 895 mbar (hPa; 26.43 inHg), while noting a compact eye 10 nautical miles across. Although Amy weakened to a Category 4 super typhoon on May 3, it regained Category 5 intensity later that day, with 1-minute sustained winds of 260 km/h (160 mph) and a central pressure of 900 mb (hPa; 26.58 inHg). The storm began to weaken by May 4 and was last noted as producing tropical-storm force winds on May 7, after which Amy was absorbed by a frontal system. Amy was one of the strongest typhoons recorded in May.

On Truk Atoll, now known as Chuuk Atoll, one person was killed after a coconut tree fell on him. On May 18, the Federated States of Micronesia was declared a disaster area by the Federal Emergency Management Agency. The weather station and over 2,250 homes were destroyed on Namonuito Atoll.

Severe Tropical Storm Babe (Etang)

Severe Tropical Storm Carla (Gening)

Typhoon Dinah (Herming) 

Across the Philippines, 13 people were killed and another 14 were reported missing. Total damage in the country reached ₱4 million.

Tropical Storm Emma (Ising)

Typhoon Freda (Luding)

Typhoon Gilda (Mameng) 

One person was killed and damage reached ₱8 million across the Philippines.

Typhoon Harriet (Neneng) 

Across the Philippines, Harriet was responsible for one fatality.

Striking near the demilitarized zone between North and South Vietnam as a powerful typhoon, Harriet caused significant disruptions to the Vietnam War. Military operations on both sides were temporarily halted, with all United States helicopters grounded. Ground movement was severely limited as well. Despite the intensity of the storm, damage was relatively light, with Camp Eagle reporting some roofs blown off from 120 km/h (75 mph) winds. Throughout Vietnam, four people were killed and fourteen others were reported missing. Thừa Thiên Province sustained the most significant damage, with 2,500 homes damaged or destroyed.

Severe Tropical Storm Ivy 

Spawned a multi vortex killer tornado that struck Omiya City while damaging many homes and buildings, the tornado killed 1 and injured 11 and it was rated as F3.

Severe Tropical Storm Kim (Oniang)

Typhoon Jean (Pepang)

Typhoon Lucy (Rosing) 

The strongest typhoon to strike the Philippines that year, this cyclone moved towards the region from the Marianas as a slow pace. Gusty southwest winds impacted western portions of Visayas and Luzon, including Manila, as the cyclone passed by on the 21st. The heavy rains led to severe flooding and landslides in north-central sections of the Philippines.

Typhoon Mary

Typhoon Nadine (Sisang) 

Nadine dissipated the next day over China, after causing 28 deaths (with 25 missing) and heavy damage on Taiwan from the flooding. Nadine also caused the crash of a Pan American cargo aircraft, killing all four people in the crew.

Typhoon Olive 

 Typhoon Olive, which developed on July 29 from the near equatorial trough, hit southwestern Japan on August 4. It continued northward, and became extratropical in the Sea of Japan. Olive's heavy rains resulted in numerous mudslides, killing 69 people. It disrupted the Boy Scout XIII World Jamboree, being held in Japan.

Severe Tropical Storm Polly (Trining)

Typhoon Rose (Uring) 

A small circulation near Chuuk organized into Tropical Storm Rose on August 10. It briefly weakened to a tropical storm on the 11th, but restrengthened to a typhoon as it continued westward. It weakened to a minimal typhoon over the mountainous terrain, but after reemerging in the South China Sea, Rose rapidly intensified, and peaked at  winds on the 16th. As it approached the coast of Hong Kong, the inflow became disrupted, but Rose still hit as a  typhoon on the 16th. The typhoon dissipated the next day, after causing 130 deaths in Hong Kong and leaving 5,600 people homeless. A Macao ferry was capsized, resulting in the loss of its 88-person crew.

Typhoon Shirley

Typhoon Trix 

An upper level low contributed to the birth of Tropical Storm Trix on August 20. After drifting northward, the storm turned to the west in response to the building of the subtropical ridge. Trix slowly strengthened after becoming a typhoon on the 21st, and reached a peak of  winds on the 28th. Trix recurved, and struck southwestern Japan on the 29th as a  typhoon. It accelerated to the northeast, and became extratropical on the 30th. Trix caused 44 deaths, with heavy crop damage amounting to $50.6 million.

Tropical Storm 25W

Typhoon Virginia 

It became extratropical on September 7 just east of Japan, after dropping more heavy rain causing 56 casualties from numerous landslides.

Typhoon Wendy

Tropical Depression 28W

Typhoon Agnes (Warling)

Typhoon Bess (Yayang) 

The typhoon weakened as it continued its movement, and struck eastern Taiwan on the 22nd as a  typhoon. It rapidly weakened over the country, and dissipated on the 10th over China. The typhoon caused heavy flooding, resulting in 32 deaths and moderate crop damage.

Severe Tropical Storm Carmen

Typhoon Della (Ading)

Typhoon Elaine (Barang)

Severe Tropical Storm Faye-Gloria (Krising-Dadang) 

A tropical disturbance east of the Marianas Islands developed into Tropical Storm Faye on October 4. At this time, there were several circulations, so it is possible that Faye was absorbed by another disturbance to its south. Regardless, the storm re-organized as it approached the Philippines. Faye crossed the islands on the 10th as a minimal tropical storm, and again became a typhoon in the South China Sea on the 11th. Steering currents became weak, and a northwest flow forced Faye southeastward back into the Philippines. Faye crossed the islands on the 12th, and dissipated on the 13th, after causing torrential rainfall killing 13 people with 80 missing.

Typhoon Hester (Goying) 

Developing as a tropical depression on October 18 near Palau Island, Hester gradually intensified as it moved westward towards the Philippines. Across the Philippines, Hester was responsible for six deaths and ₱5 million in damage. After passing over Mindanao and the Visayas as a tropical storm between October 20 and 21, the storm intensified into a typhoon before striking Palawan. Once over the South China Sea, Hester further strengthened and ultimately attained peak winds of 165 km/h (105 mph). On October 23, the storm made landfall near Huế, South Vietnam. Once onshore, Hester rapidly weakened and dissipated on October 24 over Laos.

The most significant impact from Typhoon Hester was felt in South Vietnam were winds in excess of 155 km/h (100 mph) caused extensive damage to several United States Army bases. The hardest hit base was in Chu Lai where three Americans were killed. At least 75 percent of the structures in the base sustained damage and 123 aircraft were damaged or destroyed. Newspaper reports indicated that 100 Vietnamese lost their lives due to the storm, including 33 following a plane crash near Quy Nhơn. In the wake of the storm, the South Vietnamese government provided the hardest hit areas with relief funds and supplies.

Tropical Depression Hobing

Typhoon Irma (Ining) 

It remained at sea, affecting only shipping and causing minor damage to the islands of the West Pacific. At the time, the typhoon held the record for the fastest intensification in a 24‑hour period, deepening from 980 mbar to 884 mbar but it was beaten by Typhoon Forrest of 1983.

Severe Tropical Storm Judy

Other systems 
Between January 7–8, PAGASA monitored Tropical Depression Auring. In addition to the storms listed above, the China Meteorological Agency also monitored several other tropical cyclones, including one tropical storm and two severe tropical storms.

 April 3 – 7, 55 km/h (35 mph) 1008 mbar (hPa; 29.77 inHg)
 May 16 – 19, 55 km/h (35 mph) 1005 mbar (hPa; 29.68 inHg)
 June 13 – 17, 55 km/h (35 mph) 996 mbar (hPa; 29.42 inHg)
 July 20 – 21, 75 km/h (45 mph) 990 mbar (hPa; 29.24 inHg). The CMA reported this storm as a secondary system over the Taiwan Strait related to Super Typhoon Lucy.
 August 8 – 10, 45 km/h (30 mph) 995 mbar (hPa; 29.39 inHg)
 August 28 – September 1, 55 km/h (35 mph) 1002 mbar (hPa; 29.59 inHg)
 September 12 – 15, 45 km/h (30 mph) 1000 mbar (hPa; 29.53 inHg)
 September 13 – 17, 55 km/h (35 mph) 996 mbar (hPa; 29.42 inHg)
 September 25 – 30, 55 km/h (35 mph) 1001 mbar (hPa; 29.56 inHg)
 October 5 – 7, 95 km/h (60 mph) 1002 mbar (hPa; 29.59 inHg)
 October 10 – 17,110 km/h (70 mph) 988 mbar (hPa; 29.18 inHg)
 November 4 – 8, 55 km/h (35 mph) 1002 mbar (hPa; 29.59 inHg)
 November 5 – 8, 45 km/h (30 mph) 1006 mbar (hPa; 29.71 inHg)
 November 20 – 24, 55 km/h (35 mph) 1006 mbar (hPa; 29.71 inHg)
 November 27 – 30, 55 km/h (35 mph) 1002 mbar (hPa; 29.59 inHg)
 December 27 – 30, 45 km/h (30 mph) 1005 mbar (hPa; 29.68 inHg)

Furthermore, there were two other systems listed within the International Best Tracks Database: one tropical depression and one tropical storm.

 June 11– 12, 45 km/h (30 mph)
 September 12– 14, 65 km/h (40 mph)

Season effects 
This is a table of all of the storms that have formed in the 1971 Pacific typhoon season. It includes their duration, names, affected areas, damages, and death totals. Deaths in parentheses are additional and indirect (an example of an indirect death would be a traffic accident), but were still related to that storm. Damage and deaths include totals while the storm was extratropical, a wave, or a low, and all of the damage figures are in 1971 USD. Names listed in parentheses were assigned by PAGASA.

|-
| Auring ||  || bgcolor=#| || bgcolor=#| || None ||  None || None ||
|-
| Sarah ||  || bgcolor=#| || bgcolor=#| || None ||  None || None ||
|-
| TD ||  || bgcolor=#| || bgcolor=#| || Philippines ||  None || None ||
|-
| Thelma (Bebeng) ||  || bgcolor=#| || bgcolor=#| || None ||  None || None ||
|-
| TD ||  || bgcolor=#| || bgcolor=#| || None ||  None || None ||
|-
| Vera (Karing) ||  || bgcolor=#| || bgcolor=#| || None ||  None || None ||
|-
| Wanda (Diding) ||  || bgcolor=#| || bgcolor=#| || Philippines, South Vietnam, Southern China || > || 79 ||
|-
| TD ||  || bgcolor=#| || bgcolor=#| || None ||  None || None ||
|-
| TD ||  || bgcolor=#| || bgcolor=#| || None ||  None || None ||
|-
| TD ||  || bgcolor=#| || bgcolor=#| || None ||  None || None ||
|-
| Amy ||  || bgcolor=#| || bgcolor=#| || Micronesia, Mariana Islands ||  || 1 ||
|-
| Babe (Etang) ||  || bgcolor=#| || bgcolor=#| || Philippines ||  None || None ||
|-
| TD ||  || bgcolor=#| || bgcolor=#| || None ||  None || None ||
|-
| TD ||  || bgcolor=#| || bgcolor=#| || None ||  None || None ||
|-
| Carla (Gening) ||  || bgcolor=#| || bgcolor=#| || Philippines ||  None || None ||
|-
| Dinah (Herming) ||  || bgcolor=#| || bgcolor=#| || Philippines, Southern China || Unknown || 13 ||
|-
| Emma (Ising) ||  || bgcolor=#| || bgcolor=#| || Philippines ||  None || None ||
|-
| Freda (Luding) ||  || bgcolor=#| || bgcolor=#| || Philippines, Taiwan, Southeastern China || Unknown || 7 ||
|-
| TD ||  || bgcolor=#| || bgcolor=#| || None ||  None || None ||
|-
| TD ||  || bgcolor=#| || bgcolor=#| || None ||  None || None ||
|-
| Gilda (Mameng) ||  || bgcolor=#| || bgcolor=#| || Philippines, Southern China || Unknown || 1 ||
|-
| Harriet (Neneng) ||  || bgcolor=#| || bgcolor=#| || Philippines, North Vietnam, South Vietnam || Unknown || 5 ||
|-
| Ivy ||  || bgcolor=#| || bgcolor=#| || Japan || Unknown || 1 ||
|-
| Kim (Oniang) ||  || bgcolor=#| || bgcolor=#| || Philippines, Southern China, North Vietnam || Unknown || None ||
|-
| Jean (Pepang) ||  || bgcolor=#| || bgcolor=#| || Philippines, Southern China, North Vietnam, Laos || Unknown || None ||
|-
| Lucy (Rosing) ||  || bgcolor=#| || bgcolor=#| || Philippines, Taiwan, China, || Unknown || 2 ||
|-
| Mary ||  || bgcolor=#| || bgcolor=#| || None ||  None || None ||
|-
| Nadine (Sisang) ||  || bgcolor=#| || bgcolor=#| || Mariana Islands, Philippines, Taiwan, China || Unknown || 32 ||
|-
| Olive ||  || bgcolor=#| || bgcolor=#| || Japan || Unknown || 69 ||
|-
| Polly (Trining) ||  || bgcolor=#| || bgcolor=#| || China || Unknown || None ||
|-
| TD ||  || bgcolor=#| || bgcolor=#| || None ||  None || None ||
|-
| TD ||  || bgcolor=#| || bgcolor=#| || None ||  None || None ||
|-
| Rose (Uring) ||  || bgcolor=#| || bgcolor=#| || Philippines, China || Unknown || 130 ||
|-
| Shirley ||  || bgcolor=#| || bgcolor=#| || None ||  None || None ||
|-
| Trix ||  || bgcolor=#| || bgcolor=#| || Japan ||  || 45 ||
|-
| 25W ||  || bgcolor=#| || bgcolor=#| || None ||  None || None ||
|-
| TD ||  || bgcolor=#| || bgcolor=#| || None ||  None || None ||
|-
| TD ||  || bgcolor=#| || bgcolor=#| || None ||  None || None ||
|-
| Virginia ||  || bgcolor=#| || bgcolor=#| || Japan || Unknown || 56 ||
|-
| TD ||  || bgcolor=#| || bgcolor=#| || None ||  None || None ||
|-
| Wendy ||  || bgcolor=#| || bgcolor=#| || Wake Island || Unknown || None ||
|-
| TD ||  || bgcolor=#| || bgcolor=#| || None ||  None || None ||
|-
| TD ||  || bgcolor=#| || bgcolor=#| || None ||  None || None ||
|-
| TD ||  || bgcolor=#| || bgcolor=#| || None ||  None || None ||
|-
| 28W ||  || bgcolor=#| || bgcolor=#| || None ||  None || None ||
|-
| TD ||  || bgcolor=#| || bgcolor=#| || None ||  None || None ||
|-
| Agnes (Warling) ||  || bgcolor=#| || bgcolor=#| || Taiwan, China || Unknown || 1 ||
|-
| Bess (Yayang) ||  || bgcolor=#| || bgcolor=#| || Ryukyu Islands, Taiwan, China || Unknown || 32 ||
|-
| Carmen ||  || bgcolor=#| || bgcolor=#| || Japan || Unknown || 20 ||
|-
| TD ||  || bgcolor=#| || bgcolor=#| || None ||  None || None ||
|-
| Della (Ading) ||  || bgcolor=#| || bgcolor=#| || Philippines, Southern China, North Vietnam, Laos || Unknown || None ||
|-
| Elaine (Barang) ||  || bgcolor=#| || bgcolor=#| || Philippines, Southern China, North Vietnam || Unknown || 29 ||
|-
| Faye (Krising) ||  || bgcolor=#| || bgcolor=#| || Philippines || Unknown || 13 ||
|-
| TD ||  || bgcolor=#| || bgcolor=#| || None ||  None || None ||
|-
| TD ||  || bgcolor=#| || bgcolor=#| || None ||  None || None ||
|-
| Thirty-three ||  || bgcolor=#| || bgcolor=#| || None ||  None || None ||
|-
| TD ||  || bgcolor=#| || bgcolor=#| || None ||  None || None ||
|-
| TD ||  || bgcolor=#| || bgcolor=#| || None ||  None || None ||
|-
| Hester (Goying) ||  || bgcolor=#| || bgcolor=#| || Philippines, North Vietnam, South Vietnam, Laos || > || 119 ||
|-
| TD ||  || bgcolor=#| || bgcolor=#| || Philippines ||  None || None ||
|-
| TD ||  || bgcolor=#| || bgcolor=#| || None ||  None || None ||
|-
| TD ||  || bgcolor=#| || bgcolor=#| || None ||  None || None ||
|-
| TD ||  || bgcolor=#| || bgcolor=#| || None ||  None || None ||
|-
| TD ||  || bgcolor=#| || bgcolor=#| || None ||  None || None ||
|-
| TD ||  || bgcolor=#| || bgcolor=#| || None ||  None || None ||
|-
| Irma (Ining) ||  || bgcolor=#| || bgcolor=#| || Micronesia, Ryukyu Islands || Unknown || None ||
|-
| Judy ||  || bgcolor=#| || bgcolor=#| || None || None || None ||
|-
| TD ||  || bgcolor=#| || bgcolor=#| || None ||  None || None ||
|-
| TD ||  || bgcolor=#| || bgcolor=#| || None ||  None || None ||
|-
| TD ||  || bgcolor=#| || bgcolor=#| || Philippines ||  None || None ||
|-

See also 

 List of Pacific typhoon seasons
 List of wettest tropical cyclones
 1971 Pacific hurricane season
 1971 Atlantic hurricane season
 1971 North Indian Ocean cyclone season
 Australian cyclone seasons: 1970–71, 1971–72
 South Pacific cyclone seasons: 1970–71, 1971–72
 South-West Indian Ocean cyclone seasons: 1970–71, 1971–72

References

External links 
 Japan Meteorological Agency
 Joint Typhoon Warning Center .
 China Meteorological Agency
 National Weather Service Guam
 Hong Kong Observatory
 Macau Meteorological Geophysical Services
 Korea Meteorological Agency
 Philippine Atmospheric, Geophysical and Astronomical Services Administration
 Taiwan Central Weather Bureau
 Digital Typhoon - Typhoon Images and Information
 Typhoon2000 Philippine typhoon website